Catocala agrippina, the Agrippina underwing, is a moth of the family Erebidae. The species was first described by Herman Strecker in 1874. It is found in the United States from southern New Jersey south to Florida, west to Texas and eastern Oklahoma and north to southern Indiana.

The wingspan is 75–85 mm. Adults are on wing from June to August depending on the location.

The larvae feed on Carya cordiformis (bitternut hickory).

References

External links
Oehlke, Bill "Catocala agrippina Strecker, 1874". silkmoths.bizland.com.

Moths described in 1874
agrippina
Taxa named by Herman Strecker
Moths of North America